Dr. Gary Tabor is an American environmentalist with over 30 years' experience working on behalf of large scale conservation internationally as well as 12 years as a leader within the U.S. environmental philanthropic community.  Tabor is known for his role as a catalyst in forwarding progress through large landscape conservation, pioneering the fields of Conservation Medicine and EcoHealth, and advising agencies and organizations about contemporary environmental issues.

Education

Trained as a wildlife veterinarian and ecologist, Tabor graduated in 1981 with a B.Sc. in Ecology from Cornell University.  He then went on to receive his V.M.D. in Wildlife Veterinary Medicine from the University of Pennsylvania in 1987.  Tabor also received an M.E.S. in Conservation Biology from Yale University in 1992.

Career
Tabor is the founder and Executive Director of the Center for Large Landscape Conservation, which was established in 2007.

Awards, appointments and philanthropic activities

·Chair, Connectivity Conservation Specialist Group, IUCN World Commission on Protected Areas
 
·2013-2014 Professional Fulbright Scholar on Climate Change and Clean Energy

·Senior Conservation Fellow, Center for Natural Resources and Environmental Policy, University of Montana

·Adjunct Associate Professor, Division of Biological Sciences, University of Queensland, Australia

·Former elected member to the Board of Governors of the Society for Conservation Biology.  He is also a member of the Phi Zeta, the Veterinarian Honor Society, and was awarded a Henry Luce Scholar grant.

·Previously served as the Environment Program Officer for the Geraldine R. Dodge Foundation, the Associate Director of the Henry P. Kendall Foundation,  and the Program Director for the Wilburforce Foundation.

Foundations
Co-founder of the field of Conservation Medicine 
Co-founder Yellowstone to Yukon Conservation Initiative
Co-founder Heart of the Rockies Conservation Initiative
Co-founder Network for Landscape Conservation
Co-founder Roundtable of the Crown of the Continent
Co-founder Makerere University Biological Field Station Kibale Forest
Co-founder Bwindi Mgahinga Mountain Gorilla Trust

Publications
Reaser*, J. K., G. M. Tabor*, D. J. Becker, P. Muruthi, A. Witt, S. J. Woodley, M. Ruiz-Aravena, J. A. Patz, V. Hickey, P. J. Hudson, H. Locke, and R. K. Plowright. 2021. Land use-induced spillover: priority actions for protected and conserved area managers. PARKS (In press) *equal first authors. 
Plowright, R. K., J. K. Reaser, H. Locke, S. J. Woodley, J. A. Patz, D. Becker, G. Oppler, P. Hudson, and G. M. Tabor. 2021. A call to action: understanding land use-induced zoonotic spillover to protect environmental, animal, and human health. Lancet Planetary Health.
Reaser, J. K., A. Witt, G. M. Tabor, P. J. Hudson, and R. K. Plowright. 2021. Ecological countermeasures for pandemic prevention. Ecological Restoration.
Belote, R.T., Beier, P., Creech, T., Wurtzebach, Z. and Tabor, G., 2019. A Framework for Developing Connectivity Targets and Indicators to Guide Global Conservation Efforts. BioScience.
Keeley, A.T.H., Beier, P., Creech, T., Jones, K., Jongman, R., Stonecipher, G. and Tabor, G.M., 2019. Thirty years of connectivity conservation planning: an assessment of factors influencing plan implementation. Environmental Research Letters. 30 Sept.
Tabor, G., Bankova-Todorova, M., Ayram, C., Andrés, C., Garcia, L.C., Kapos, V., Olds, A. and Stupariu, I., 2019. Ecological Connectivity: A Bridge to Preserving Biodiversity-Frontiers 2018/19: Emerging Issues of Environmental Concern Chapter 2. Frontiers 2018/19: Emerging Issues of Environmental Concern. United Nations Environment Program.
M. Cross, E. Zavaleta, D. Bachelet, M. Brooks, C. Enquist, E. Fleishman, L. Graumlich, C. Groves, H. Elizabeth Tabor, and G. Tabor. "A Climate Change Adaptation Framework for Natural Resource Conservation and Management. Conservation Letters    (In review).
E. Zavaleta, D. Miller, N. Salafsky, E. Fleishman, M. Weber, B. Gold, D. Hulse, M. Rowen, G. Tabor and J. Vanderryn. "Enhancing the Engagement of U.S. Private Foundations with Conservation Science". Journal of Conservation Biology. 2009. (In press).
D. Lindenmayer, R. Hobbs, R. Montague-Drake, J. Alexandra, A. Bennett, M. Burgman, P. Cale, V. Cramer, P. Cullen, D. Driscoll, J. Franklin, Y. Haila, M. Hunter, P. Gibbons, S. Lake, G. Luck, C. MacGregor, S. McIntyre, R. MacNally, A. Manning, J. Miller, H. Mooney, R. Noss, H. Possingham, D. Saunders, F. Schmiegelow, M. Scott, D. Simberloff, T. Sisk, G. Tabor, B. Walker, J. Wiens, J. Woinarski, and E. Zavaleta. "A Checklist for Ecological Management of Landscapes for Conservation". Ecology Letters. October 2007.
L. Bienen and G. Tabor. "Applying an Ecosystem Approach to Brucellosis Control: Can an Old Conflict Between Wildlife and Agriculture Be Successfully Managed?" Frontiers in Ecology and the Environment. 2006; 4(6): 319-327.
H. Locke and G. Tabor. "The Future of Y2Y" in Yellowstone to Yukon: Freedom to Roam, F. Schulz. The Mountaineers Books. 2005. Seattle.
G. Tabor and H. Locke. 2004. "Yellowstone to Yukon Conservation Initiative" in Managing Mountain Protected Areas: Challenges and Responses for the 21st Century. David Harmon and Graeme Worboys (eds). Colledara, Italy, Andromeda Editrice. 429 pp.
P. Daszak, G. Tabor, A. Marm Kilpatrick, et al. "Conservation Medicine and a New Agenda for Emerging Diseases". Annals of the New York Acadademy of Sciences. 2004; 1026:1-11.
J.A. Patz, P. Daszak, G. Tabor, et al.  "Unhealthy Landscapes: Policy Recommendations on Land Use Change and Disease Emergence". Environmental Health Perspectives. 2004. Vol. 112:10 1092-1098.
G. Tabor and A.A. Aguirre.  "Ecosystem Health and Sentinel Species: Adding an Ecological Element to the Proverbial 'Canary in the Mineshaft'”. Ecohealth. September 2004. Vol. 1:3.
A.A. Aguirre, R.S. Ostfeld, G. Tabor, C.A. House and M.C. Pearl (eds.).  Conservation Medicine: Ecological Health in Practice. 2002. Oxford University Press, New York, 407 pp.
G. Tabor, R.S. Ostfeld, M. Poss, A.P. Dobson, and A.A. Aguirre, "Conservation Biology and the Health Sciences: Defining the Research Priorities of Conservation Medicine" in Research Priorities in Conservation Biology. M.E. Soulé and G.H. Orians (eds.). 2001. 2nd edition. Island Press; Washington, D.C.
C.M. Gillin, G. Tabor, and A.A. Aguirre. 2002. "Ecological Health and Wildlife Disease Management in National Parks" in Conservation Medicine: Ecological Health in Practice. A.A., Aguirre, R.S. Ostfeld, G. Tabor, C.A. House and M.C. Pearl (eds.). 2002. Oxford University Press, New York.

See also
 Conservation medicine
 Climate Adaptation
 Wildlife corridor
 Harvey Locke

References

External links
 Center for Large Landscape Conservation
 Yellowstone to Yukon Conservation Initiative
 New England Grassroots Environment Fund
 African Wildlife Foundation
 Consortium for Conservation Medicine

Year of birth missing (living people)
Living people
American environmentalists
University of Pennsylvania School of Veterinary Medicine alumni
Cornell University alumni